Gilson Manuel Silva Alves (born 18 March 1987 in Fogo), sometimes known as Ja, is a Cape Verdean football forward, as of 2013 who plays for Olympique du Kef in the Tunisian Ligue Professionnelle 2.

His first youth club was Batuque, he participated in two other clubs abroad, Rapid Bucharest and Nadi al-Jazira in the Emirates, likely the first Cape Verdean player to participate in the youth player.  Gilson Silva appeared in the senior level and his first two clubs were of his nation, Batuque FC in the early part of the 2004-05 season and later Botafogo FC from Fogo.  Gelson later played professional clubs in Tunisia including Étoile Sahel (played as of January 2014), US Monastir, Olympique de Kef and Sbiba.  In between Étoile, outside Tunisia, he played with EA Guingamp, later he played with Ceuta in the Spanish Leagues.

Whilst at Guingamp, then in Ligue 2, Silva played in the 2009 Coupe de France Final in which they beat Rennes.

International career
Silva has played for the senior Cape Verde national football team in a qualifying match for the 2010 FIFA World Cup.

Personal life
He married Sandra in 2008 and raised their first child, a daughter in 2009.

References

External links

1987 births
Living people
Cape Verdean footballers
Cape Verde international footballers
Association football forwards
People from Fogo, Cape Verde
Batuque FC players
Étoile Sportive du Sahel players
En Avant Guingamp players
AD Ceuta footballers
AS Ariana players
CS Chebba players
Olympique du Kef players
US Monastir (football) players
Ligue 2 players